Vitalstatistix, formerly Vitalstatistix National Women's Theatre, is a women's theatre company based in Port Adelaide, South Australia.

History 
Vitalstatistix was founded in 1984 by artists Roxy Bent, Ollie Black and Margie Fisher. It was originally based in the old Holden factory in Port Adelaide, but since 1992 has been housed in the heritage-listed Waterside Workers Hall.

It became known an Australia's most prolific full-time professional women's theatre company and was instrumental in the development of many female directors, actors, writers and designers.

Events and people
The organisation is well-known for multidisciplinary annual arts event, Adhocracy.

Notable artists/groups who have worked with Vitalstatistix include Melbourne-based experimental theatre company The Rabble, Australian playwright Finegan Kruckemeyer, documentary theatre maker Roslyn Oades; former artistic director of State Theatre Company of South Australia, Rosalba Clemente; and former artistic director Catherine Fitzgerald.

Recognition
It received South Australian Ruby Awards in the 2014 Innovation category for Adhocracy and a 2018 award for Outstanding Contribution by an Organisation or Group.

References 

Performing arts in Adelaide
Theatre companies in Australia